Tytthaspis are a genus of ladybird beetles. They have comb-like structures on their mandibles with which they gather fungal spores.
The genus contains two subgenera (Barovskia and Tytthaspis) and the following species:

Tytthaspis gebleri (=Tytthaspis lineola)
Tytthaspis phalerata
Tytthaspis sedecimguttata
Tytthaspis sedecimpunctata (=Tytthaspis 16-punctata)
Tytthaspis 19-guttata
Tytthaspis trilineata (see Coccinella nigrovittata)
Tytthaspis univittata (see Pseudoverania univittata)

References

Coccinellidae genera
Taxa named by George Robert Crotch